The 2016 Southland Conference women's basketball tournament, a part of the 2015–16 NCAA Division I women's basketball season, will take place March 10–13, 2016 at the Merrell Center in Katy, Texas. The winner of the tournament will receive the Southland Conference's automatic bid to the 2016 NCAA tournament.

Seeds and regular season standings
Only the Top 8 teams advance to the Southland Conference tournament. If a team ineligible for the NCAA Tourney should finish in the top 8, their seed will fall to the next eligible team. Abilene Christian and Incarnate Word are ineligible for post-season play as they are in the third year of a 4-year transition from D2 to D1. They won't be eligible for the Southland tourney until 2018. This chart shows all the teams records and standings and explains why teams advanced to the conference tourney or finished in certain tiebreaking positions.

Schedule

Bracket

See also
2016 Southland Conference men's basketball tournament
Southland Conference women's basketball tournament

References

External links
  2016 Southland Conference Men's and Women's Tournament Page

Southland Conference women's basketball tournament
2015–16 Southland Conference women's basketball season
Southland Conference Women's basketball